Ciliatovelutina lanigera is a species of small sea snail, a marine gastropod mollusk in the family Velutinidae.

Description
They are benthos and are predators, feeding on sessile prey.

Distribution
The distribution of Ciliatovelutina lanigera includes:
 European waters
 North West Atlantic, Canada: Baffin Island

References

Velutinidae
Gastropods described in 1842